In the United States, the term "veto" is used to describe an action by which the president prevents an act passed by Congress from becoming law. This article provides a summary and details of the bills vetoed by presidents.

Veto procedure

Although the term "veto" does not appear in the United States Constitution, Article I requires every bill, order, resolution, or other act of legislation approved by the Congress to be presented to the president for his approval. Once the bill is presented to the president, there are several scenarios which may play out:
 The president may sign the bill into law within ten days (excluding Sundays).
 The president may veto the bill by returning it to Congress with a statement of his objections within ten days (excluding Sundays). If the president vetoes a bill, the Congress shall reconsider it (together with the president's objections), and if both houses of the Congress vote to pass the law again by a two-thirds majority, then the bill becomes law, notwithstanding the president's veto. (The term "override" is used to describe this process of overcoming a presidential veto.)
 If the president does nothing with the bill (neither signing it nor returning it to Congress with objections) and the Congress does not adjourn, then the bill becomes law after ten days (excluding Sundays).
 If the president does nothing with the bill and the Congress adjourns before the tenth day (excluding Sundays), then the bill expires and does not become law. The term "pocket veto" is used to describe this practice. Pocket vetoes cannot be overridden, so if the Congress still wants the piece of legislation enacted, a new bill must be introduced and passed (at which point it would again be subject to a veto).

Although each case is different, one general rule can be acknowledged: presidents use their prerogative to veto legislation when such legislation does not represent their viewpoint or agenda.

Occasionally, a president either publicly or privately threatens Congress with a veto to influence the content or passage of legislation. There is no record of what constitutes a "veto threat" or how many have been made over the years, but it has become a staple of presidential politics and a sometimes effective way of shaping policy. A president may also warn Congress of a veto of a particular bill so as to persuade Congress not to waste time passing particular legislation or including certain provisions in a bill when the president is prepared to veto it.

Summary

Presidents with most or fewest vetoes

Full veto record 
The following is an incomplete list of the dates and bills of each veto for each president:

George Washington

Two vetoes:
 April 5, 1792: Vetoed an earlier apportionment bill than the Apportionment Act of 1792 on constitutional grounds. Override attempt failed in the House (23–33).
 February 28, 1797: vetoed A Bill to alter and amend an Act titled, "An Act to ascertain and fix the military establishment of the United States" on the advice of Secretary of War James McHenry.

John Adams

No vetoes. Adams was the first president not to exercise the veto.

Thomas Jefferson

No vetoes. Jefferson is the only two-term president never to have used the veto.

James Madison

Five regular vetoes, two pocket vetoes:
 An act incorporating the Protestant Episcopal Church in the town of Alexandria in the District of Columbia, vetoed February 21, 1811. The bill provided for the incorporation of an Episcopal church in Alexandria into the District of Columbia. Madison vetoed it on the ground that it violated the Establishment Clause.
 An act for the relief of Richard Tervin, William Coleman, Edwin Lewis, Samuel Mims, Joseph Wilson, and the Baptist Church at Salem Meeting House, in the Mississippi Territory, vetoed February 28, 1811. The bill granting public lands to a Baptist church in the Mississippi Territory. Madison vetoed it on the ground that it violated the Establishment Clause.
 For the trial of Causes pending in the respective District Courts of the United States, in case of the absence or disability of the Judges thereof, vetoed April 3, 1812.
 On the subject of a uniform rule of naturalization, pocket vetoed.
 To incorporate the subscribers to the Bank of the United States of America, vetoed January 30, 1815.
 To provide for free information of stereotype plates and to encourage the printing and gratuitous distribution of the Scriptures by the Bible societies within the United States, pocket vetoed.
 The Bonus Bill (An act to set apart and pledge certain funds for internal improvements, and which sets apart and pledges funds for constructing roads and canals, and improving the navigation of water courses to facilitate, promote, and give security to internal commerce among the several States, and to render more easy and less expensive the means and provisions for the common defense), vetoed March 3, 1817. The bill was sponsored by John C. Calhoun and provided for internal improvements using surplus funds from the Second Bank of the United States. Madison vetoed on constitutional grounds.

James Monroe

One veto:
 The Cumberland Road Bill  (An act for the preservation and repair of the Cumberland road), vetoed May 4, 1822. Monroe wrote in his veto message that "A power to establish turnpikes with gates and tolls, and to enforce the collection of tolls by penalties, implies a power to adopt and execute a complete system of internal improvement," which he believed was unconstitutional.

John Quincy Adams

No vetoes. Adams was the third and most recent president to never use the veto power while serving at least one complete term in office.

Andrew Jackson

Twelve vetoes:
 On May 27, 1830, he vetoed a bill that would allow the Federal government to purchase stock in the Maysville, Washington, Paris, and Lexington Turnpike Road Company, which had been organized to construct a road linking Lexington and the Ohio River, the entirety of which would be in the state of Kentucky.
 To authorize a subscription of stock in the Maysville, Washington, Paris, and Lexington Turnpike Road Company, vetoed May 30, 1830.
 To authorize a subscription for stock on the part of the United States in the Louisville and Portland Canal Company, pocket vetoed.
 For making appropriations for building light-houses, light-boats, and monuments, placing buoys, and improving harbors and directing surveys, pocket vetoed.
 Second Bank of the United States Re-Charter, vetoed July 10, 1832.
 For the final settlement of the claims of States for interests on advances to the United States, made during the last war, pocket vetoed.
 For the improvement of certain harbors, and the navigation of certain rivers, pocket vetoed.
 To appropriate, for a limited time, the proceeds of the sales of the public lands of the United States, and for granting lands to certain states, pocket vetoed.
 To improve the navigation of the Wabash River, pocket vetoed.
 To authorize the Secretary of the Treasury to compromise the claims allowed by the Commissioners under the treaty with the King of the Two Sicilies, concluded October 14, 1832, vetoed March 3, 1835.
 To appoint a day for the annual meeting of Congress, vetoed June 10, 1836.
 Act of Congress Overruling Jackson's Specie Circular, pocket vetoed.

Martin Van Buren

One pocket veto:
 To provide for the distribution, in part, of the Madison Papers, pocket vetoed.

William Henry Harrison

No vetoes.  Harrison died after four weeks in office. Congress was never in session during his tenure, and never presented any legislation for his approval.

John Tyler

Ten total vetoes, including four pocket vetoes:
 To incorporate the subscribers to the Fiscal Bank of the United States of America, vetoed August 16, 1841.
 Fiscal Corporation Bill. To provide for the better collection, safekeeping, and disbursement of the public revenue, by means of a corporation to be styled the Fiscal Corporation of the United States, vetoed September 9, 1841.
 To provide revenue from imports, and to change and modify existing laws imposing duties on imports, vetoed August 9, 1842.
 To extend for a limited period the present laws for laying and collecting duties on imports,  vetoed June 29, 1842.
 Regulating the taking of testimony on cases of contested elections, pocket vetoed.
 To appropriate the proceeds of the sales of public lands, and to grant pre-exemption rights, pocket vetoed.
 Directing payment of the certificates or awards issued by the commissioners under the treaty with the Cherokee Indians, pocket vetoed.
 Making appropriations for the improvement of certain harbors and rivers, vetoed June 11, 1844.
 An act relating to revenue cutters and steamers, vetoed February 20, 1845.  Veto Overridden.  The Senate overrode the veto on March 3, 1845, by a vote of 41 yeas to 1 nay.  The House overrode the veto on March 3, 1845, by a vote of 127 yeas to 30 nays. This was the first veto to be successfully overridden by Congress. 
 Making appropriations for the improvements of navigation of certain harbors and rivers, pocket vetoed.

James K. Polk

Two regular vetoes, plus one pocket veto.

 To provide for the ascertainment and satisfaction of claims of American citizens for spoliations committed by the French prior to the July 31, 1801, vetoed August 8, 1846. Override failed the Senate by a vote of 27 yeas to 15 nays on August 10, 1846.
 Making appropriations for the improvement of certain harbors and rivers, vetoed August 3, 1846. Override failed the House by a vote of 97 yeas to 91 nays on August 4, 1846.
 To provide for continuing certain works in the Territory of Wisconsin, pocket vetoed March 3, 1847.

Zachary Taylor

No vetoes.

Millard Fillmore

No vetoes.

Franklin Pierce

Nine vetoes:
 Making a grant of public lands to the several States for the benefit of indigent insane persons, vetoed May 3, 1854.
 Making appropriations for the repair, preservation, and completion of certain public works, heretofore commenced under authority of law, vetoed August 4, 1854.
 To provide for the ascertainment of claims of American citizens or spoliations committed by the French prior to July 31, 1801, vetoed February 17, 1855.
 Making appropriations for the transportation of the United States mail, by ocean steamships and otherwise, during the fiscal years ending June 30, 1855 and June 30, 1856, vetoed March 3, 1855.
 Making an appropriation for deepening the channel over the St. Clair Flats, in the State of Michigan, vetoed May 19, 1856. Veto overridden by the Senate on July 7, 1856 (28–8), and by the House on July 8, 1856 (139–55).
 To remove obstructions to navigation in the mouth of the Mississippi River, at the Southwest Pass and Pass a l'Outre, vetoed May 19, 1856. Veto overridden by the Senate on July 7, 1856 (31–12), and by the House on July 8, 1856 (143–55).
 Making an appropriation for deepening the channel over the flats of the St. Mary's River, in the State of Michigan, vetoed May 22, 1856. Veto overridden by the Senate on July 7, 1856 (28–10), and by the House on July 8, 1856 (136–54).
 For continuing the improvement of the Des Moines Rapids, in the Mississippi River, vetoed August 11, 1856. Veto overridden by the House on August 11, 1856 (130–54), and by the Senate on August 16, 1856 (30–14).
 For the improvement of the navigation of the Patapsco River, and to render the port of Baltimore accessible to the war steamers of the United States, vetoed August 14, 1856. Veto overridden by the Senate on August 16, 1856 (31–14), and by the House on August 16, 1856 (127–47).

James Buchanan

Four regular vetoes, plus three pocket vetoes.
 June 14, 1858 – H.J. Res. 37. In regard to the carrying of the United States mails from St. Joseph's, Missouri, to Placerville, California. Pocket veto.
 February 24, 1859 – H.R. 2. Donating public lands to the several States and Territories which may provide colleges for the benefit of agriculture and the mechanic arts. Regular veto. Override attempt failed in the House (105–96).
 March 10, 1859 – S. 321. Making an appropriation for deepening the channel over the St. Clair flats, in the State of Michigan. Pocket veto.
 March 10, 1859 – S.J. Res. 87. In relation to removal of obstructions to navigation in the mouth of the Mississippi River. Pocket veto.
 April 17, 1860 – S. 29. For the relief of Arthur Edwards and his associates. Regular veto. Override attempt failed in the Senate (22–30).
 June 22, 1860 – S. 416. Homestead Act (To secure homesteads to actual settlers on the public domain.) Regular veto. Override attempt failed in the Senate (28–18).
 January 25, 1861 – H.R. 915. For the relief of Hockaday and Leggit. Regular veto. Override attempt failed in the House (81–67).

Abraham Lincoln

Two regular vetoes, plus five pocket vetoes.
 June 23, 1862 – S. 193. To repeal that part of an act of Congress which prohibits the circulation of bank notes of a less denomination than five dollars within the District of Columbia. Regular veto. No override attempt.
 July 2, 1862 – S. 343. To provide for additional medical officers of the volunteer service. Regular veto. Override attempt failed in the Senate (0–37).
 March 3, 1863 – S. 424. To amend an act entitled, "An act to establish and good the grades of line officers of the U.S. Navy." Pocket veto.
 July 4, 1864 – H.R. 244. Wade–Davis Bill To guarantee to certain States, whose governments have been usurped or overthrown, a republican form of government. Pocket veto.
 July 4, 1864 – H.J. Res. 123. To correct certain clerical errors in the internal revenue act. Pocket veto.
 March 3, 1865 – H.R. 805. To repeal the eighth section of an act titled, "An act in addition to the several acts concerning commercial intercourse between loyal and insurrectionary States, and to provide for the collection of captured and abandoned property, and the prevention of frauds in States declared in insurrection." Pocket veto.
 March 3, 1865 – H.J. Res. 161. In relation to certain railroads. Pocket veto.

Andrew Johnson

Andrew Johnson was the most thwarted president as measured by the number of overrides: out of 21 regular vetoes, 15 were overridden; he also used 8 pocket vetoes.  By fraction overridden, however, he comes in second: Pierce had a rate of 56%, compared to Johnson's 52%.
 February 19, 1866 – S. 60. To establish a Bureau for the Relief of Freedmen and Refugees. Regular veto. Override attempt failed in the Senate (30–18).
 March 27, 1866 – S. 61. Civil Rights Act of 1866 (To protect all persons in the United States in their civil rights, and furnish the means of their vindication.) Regular veto. Veto overridden by the Senate (33–15) and the House (122–41).
 May 15, 1866 – S. 74. For the admission of the State of Colorado into the Union. Regular veto. No override attempt.
 June 15, 1866 – S. 203. To enable the New York and Montana Iron Mining and Manufacturing Company to purchase a certain amount of the public lands not now in market. Regular veto. No override attempt.
 July 16, 1866 – H.R. 613. To continue in force and to amend an act entitled "An act to establish a Bureau for the Relief of Freedmen and Refugees," and for other purposes. Regular veto. Veto overridden by the House (103–33) and the Senate (33–12).
 July 28, 1866 – H.R. 466. Erecting the Territory of Montana into a surveying district. Regular veto. No override attempt.
 July 28, 1866 – S. 447. For the admission of the State of Nebraska into the Union. Pocket veto.
 July 28, 1866 – H.J. Res. 191. Relating to the building lately occupied for a national fair in aid of the orphans of soldiers and sailors of the United States. Pocket veto.
 January 5, 1867 – S. 1. To regulate the elective franchise in the District of Columbia. Regular veto. Veto overridden by the Senate (29–10) and the House (112–38).
 January 28, 1867 – S. 462. For the admission of the State of Colorado into the Union. Regular veto. Override attempt failed in the Senate (29–19).
 January 29, 1867 – S. 456. For the admission of the State of Nebraska into the Union. Regular veto. Veto overridden by the Senate (31–9) and the House (120–44).
 March 2, 1867 – S. 453. Tenure of Office Act (1867) (Regulating the tenure of certain civil offices.) Regular veto. Veto overridden by the Senate (35–11) and the House (138–40).
 March 2, 1867 – H.R. 1143. To provide for the more efficient government of the rebel States. Regular veto. Veto overridden by the House (138–51) and the Senate (38–10).
 March 23, 1867 – H.R. 33. Supplementary to an act entitled, "An act to provide for more efficient government of the rebel States." Regular veto. Veto overridden by the House (114–25) and the Senate (40–7).
 March 30, 1867 – H.J. Res. 6. Placing certain troops of Missouri on an equal footing with volunteers as to bounties. Pocket veto.
 July 19, 1867 – H.R. 123. Supplementary to an act entitled, "An act to provide for more efficient government of the rebel States." Regular veto. Veto overridden by the House (109–25) and the Senate (30–6).
 July 19, 1867 – H.J. Res. 71. To carry into effect the several acts providing for the more efficient government of the rebel States. Regular veto. Veto overridden by the House (99–22) and the Senate (32–4).
 July 20, 1867 – S. 137. For the further security of equal rights in the District of Columbia. Pocket veto.
 December 20, 1867 – S. 141. For the further security of equal rights in the District of Columbia. Pocket veto.
 December 20, 1867 – H.R. 161. To incorporate the congregation of the First Presbyterian Church of Washington. Pocket veto.
 March 25, 1868 – S. 213. To amend an act entitled, "An Act to amend the judiciary act: passed, September 24, 1789." Regular veto. Veto overridden by the Senate (33–9) and the House (115–34).
 June 20, 1868 – H.R. 1039. To admit the State of Arkansas to representation in Congress. Regular veto. Veto overridden by the House (111–31) and the Senate (30–7).
 June 25, 1868 – H.R. 1058. To admit the States of North Carolina, South Carolina, Louisiana, Georgia, Alabama, and Florida, to representation in Congress. Regular veto. Veto overridden by the House (108–32) and the Senate (35–8).
 July 20, 1868 – S.J. Res. 169. Excluding from the electoral college the votes of States lately in rebellion which shall not have been reorganized. Regular veto. Veto overridden by the Senate (45–8) and the House (134–36).
 July 25, 1868 – S. 567. Relating to the Freedman's Bureau and providing for its discontinuance. Regular veto. Veto overridden by the Senate (42–5) and the House (115–23).
 July 27, 1868 – S. 207. For funding the national debt, and for the conversion of the notes of the United States. Pocket veto.
 July 27, 1868 – S. 491. To provide for the appointment of recorder of deeds in the District of Columbia. Pocket veto.
 February 13, 1869 – S. 609. Transferring the duties of trustees of colored schools of Washington and Georgetown. No override attempt.
 February 22, 1869 – H.R. 1460. Regulating the duties on imported copper and copper ores. Veto overridden by the House (115–56) and the Senate (38–12).

Ulysses S. Grant

Ninety-three vetoes total, with forty-five regular vetoes and forty-eight pocket vetoes. Four were overridden.
 April 10, 1869 – H.J. Res. 29. For the relief of Blanton Duncan. Pocket veto.
 January 11, 1870 – S. 273. For the relief of Rollin White. Regular veto. Override attempt passed in the Senate (41–13), but failed in the House (12–168).
 July 14, 1870 – S. 476. To fix the status of certain Federal soldiers enlisting in the Union Army from the States of Alabama and Florida. Regular veto. No override attempt.
 January 4, 1871 – H.R. 1395. For the relief of Charles Cooper, Goshorn A. Jones, Jerome Rowley, William Hannegan and John Hannegan. Regular veto. No override attempt.
 February 7, 1871 – S.J. Res. 92. For the relief of certain contractor for the construction of vessels of war and steam machinery. Regular veto. Override attempt failed in the Senate (2–57).
 February 28, 1871 – H.R. 2566. For the relief of Henry Willman, late a private in the Third Regiment Indian Cavalry. Regular veto. No override attempt.
 March 3, 1871 – S. 109. In relation to the Selma, Rome, and Dalton Railroad Company, Alabama. Pocket veto.
 March 3, 1871 – S. 493. For the relief of George Wright. Pocket veto.
 March 3, 1871 – S. 762. For the relief of Joseph Ormsby. Pocket veto.
 March 3, 1871 – S. 799. For the relief of Anna M. Howard. Pocket veto.
 March 3, 1871 – S. 995. For the relief of purchasers of lands sold for taxes in the insurrectionary States. Pocket veto.
 March 3, 1871 – S. 1213. For the relief of Mary M. Clark, widow of Leonard Clark, deceased. Pocket veto.
 March 3, 1871 – S.J. Res. 295. Relating to rights of actual settlers upon certain lands in Iowa. Pocket veto.
 March 3, 1871 – H.R. 1831. To confirm the title of the Rancho del Rio Grande, in New Mexico, to the heirs and legal representatives of the original grantees thereof. Pocket veto.
 March 3, 1871 – H.R. 2234. Granting a pension to Adam Correll. Pocket veto.
 March 3, 1871 – H.R. 2591. Relating to telegraphic communication between the United States and foreign countries. Pocket veto.
 April 20, 1871 – S. 294. For the relief of the inhabitants of the town of Arcata, in Humboldt County, California. Pocket veto.
 March 28, 1872 – H.R. 1550. For the relief of the estate of Dr. John F. Hanks. Regular veto. Override attempt passed in the House (126–17) but died in the Senate.
 April 1, 1872 – H.R. 1867. For the relief of James T. Johnson. Regular veto. No override attempt.
 April 10, 1872 – H.R. 2041. For the relief of the children of John M. Baker, deceased. Regular veto. No override attempt.
 April 15, 1872 – S. 805. Granting a pension to Abigail Ryan, widow of Thomas A. Ryan. Regular veto. No override attempt.
 April 22, 1872 – H.R. 622. Granting a pension to Richard B. Crawford. Regular veto. No override attempt.
 May 14, 1872 – S. 955. Granting a pension to Mary Ann Montgomery, widow of William W. Montgomery, late captain in the Texas volunteers. Regular veto. Veto overridden by the Senate (44–1) and the House (101–44).
 June 1, 1872 – S. 105. For the relief of Dr. J. Milton Best. Regular veto. No override attempt.
 June 7, 1872 – S. 569. For the relief of Thomas B. Wallace, of Lexington, in the State of Missouri. Regular veto. No override attempt.
 June 10, 1872 – H.R. 1424. To reimburse John E. Woodward for certain moneys paid by him. Pocket veto.
 June 10, 1872 – H.R. 2622. For the relief of James De Long, late consul at Aux Cayes, Hayti. Pocket veto.
 January 6, 1873 – H.R. 2291. For the relief of Edmund Jessen. Regular veto. No override attempt.
 January 22, 1873 – H.R. 630. In relation to new trials in the Court of Claims. Regular veto. No override attempt.
 January 29, 1873 – S. 490. For the relief of the East Tennessee University. Regular veto. No override attempt.
 February 8, 1873 – H.R. 2852. For the relief of James A. McCullah, late collector of the fifth district of Missouri. Regular veto. No override attempt.
 February 11, 1873 – S. 161. For the relief of those suffering from the destruction of saltworks near Manchester, Kentucky, pursuant to the order of Major-General Buell. Regular veto. No override attempt.
 March 3, 1873 – S. 96. For the relief of Cowan and Dickinson, of Knoxville, Tennessee. Pocket veto.
 March 3, 1873 – S. 166. For the relief of David Braden. Pocket veto.
 March 3, 1873 – S. 245. Amendatory of an act for the construction of a bridge across the Arkansas River, at Little Rock, Arkansas. Pocket veto.
 March 3, 1873 – S. 809. To establish an assay-office at Helena, in the Territory of Montana. Pocket veto.
 March 3, 1873 – S. 1109. For the relief of Edward Berry, John McFall, and William H. Judd. Pocket veto.
 March 3, 1873 – S. 1168. To amend an act entitled, "An act to remove the charge of desertion from certain soldiers of the Thirteenth Tennessee Cavalry." Pocket veto.
 March 3, 1873 – S. 1480. For the relief of W.W. Elliott. Pocket veto.
 March 3, 1873 – H.R. 1868. For the relief of Elias C. Boudinot. Pocket veto.
 March 3, 1873 – H.R. 2264. To authorize the Cattaraugus and Allegany Indians in New York to lease lands and confirm leases. Pocket veto.
 March 3, 1873 – H.R. 2803. For the relief of Samuel J. Potter. Pocket veto.
 March 3, 1873 – H.R. 2902. For the relief of the estates of Abel Gilbert and William Gerrish, late copartners in business under the style of Gilbert and Gerrish. Pocket veto.
 March 3, 1873 – H.R. 3369. For the relief of George S. Gustin, late a private of Company D, Seventy-Fourth Regiment Illinois Infantry Volunteers. Pocket veto.
 March 3, 1873 – H.R. 3484. Granting a pension to Asenath Stephenson. Pocket veto.
 March 3, 1873 – H.R. 3731. To confirm certain land titles in the State of Missouri. Pocket veto.
 March 3, 1873 – H.R. 3857. For the relief of J. George Harris. Pocket veto.
 March 3, 1873 – H.R. 3878. For the relief of Mrs. Louisa Eldis. Pocket veto.
 April 10, 1874 – H.R. 1224. For the relief of William H. Denniston, late an acting lieutenant, Seventieth New York volunteers. Regular veto. No override attempt.
 April 22, 1874 – S. 617. To fix the amount of United States notes and the circulation of national banks. Regular veto. Override attempt failed in the Senate (34–30).
 May 12, 1874 – H.R. 1331 For the relief of Joab Spencer and James R. Mead, for supplies furnished for the Kansas tribe of Indians. Regular veto. No override attempt.
 June 23, 1874 – H.R. 921. To prevent the useless slaughter of buffaloes within the territories of the United States. Pocket veto.
 June 23, 1874 – H.R. 1313. For the relief of Alexander Burtch. Pocket veto.
 January 30, 1875 – H.R. 4462. For the relief of Alexander Burtch. Regular veto. No override attempt.
 February 12, 1875 – H.R. 2352. Granting a pension to Lewis Hinley. Regular veto. No override attempt.
 March 3, 1875 – S. 271. For the relief of Frances A. Robinson, administratrix of the estate of John M. Robinson, deceased. Pocket veto.
 March 3, 1875 – S. 878. For the relief of Rosa Vertner Jeffreys. Pocket veto.
 March 3, 1875 – S. 909. Approving an act of the legislative assembly of Colorado Territory. Pocket veto.
 March 3, 1875 – S. 935. To provide for writs of error in certain criminal cases, for hearings therein, and in cases of habeas corpus. Pocket veto.
 March 3, 1875 – S. 951. For the relief of John Montgomery and Thomas E. Williams. Pocket veto.
 March 3, 1875 – H.R. 3170. For the relief of John W. Marsh. Pocket veto.
 March 3, 1875 – H.R. 3341. To equalize the bounties of soldiers who served in the war for the Union. Pocket veto.
 March 3, 1875 – H.R. 4669. To provide for the selection of grand a petit jurors in the District of Columbia. Pocket veto.
 March 3, 1875 – H.J. Res. 51. In relation to civil service examinations. Pocket veto.
 February 3, 1876. – H.R. 1561. Transferring the custody of certain Indian trust funds from the Secretary of the Interior to the Treasurer of the United States. Regular veto. No override attempt.
 March 27, 1876 – H.R. 83. To provide  for the relief of James A. Hile, of Lewis County, Missouri. Regular veto. No override attempt.
 March 31, 1876 – S. 489. For the relief of G.B. Tyler and E.H. Luckett, assignees of William T. Cheatham. Regular veto. Overridden by Senate, 46–0.
 April 18, 1876 – S. 172. Fixing the salary of the president of the United States. Regular veto. No override attempt.
 May 26, 1876 – H.R. 1922. Providing for the recording of deeds,  mortgages, and other conveyances affecting real estate in the District of Columbia. Regular veto. No override attempt.
 June 9, 1876 – S. 165. For the relief of Michael W. Brock, of Megis County Tennessee, late a private in Company D, Tenth Tennessee Volunteers. Regular veto. No override attempt.
 June 30, 1876 –  S. 692. To amend chapter 166 of the laws of the second session of the Forty-third Congress relating to the Fox and Wisconsin Rivers. Regular veto. No override attempt.
 July 11, 1876. – H.R. 1337. To provide for the relief of Nelson Tiffany. Regular veto. Overridden by House, 177–1.
 July 13, 1876. – H.R. 11. To provide a pension to Eliza Jane Blumer. Regular veto. No override attempt.
 July 20, 1876. – H.R. 2684. To amend sections 3496, 3951, and 3954 of the Revised Statutes, relating to bids and contracts. Regular veto. No override attempt.
 August 14, 1876. – H.R. 36. To restore the name of Capt. Edward S. Meyer to the active list of the Army. Regular veto. No override attempt.
 August 15, 1876. – S. 561. For the relief of Major Junius T. Turner. Regular veto. No override attempt.
 August 15, 1876. – S. 779. To provide for the sale of a portion of the reservation of the Confederated Otoe and Missouri and the Sac and Foxes of the Missouri Tribes of Indians in the States of Kansas and Nebraska. Regular veto. Overridden by Senate, 36–0.
 August 15, 1876. – S. 990. To remove the political disabilities of Reuben Davis of Mississippi. Pocket veto.
 August 15, 1876. – H.R. 4085. To repeal part of section 5 of an act entitled, "An act authorizing the repavement of Pennsylvania Avenue." Regular veto. No override attempt.

Rutherford B. Hayes

Thirteen vetoes. Twelve regular. One pocket veto. One veto overridden.
 
 To authorize the coinage of the standard silver dollar and to restore its legal-tender character. Vetoed February 28, 1878. Regular veto. Overridden by the House of Representatives, 196–73. Overridden by Senate, 46–19.
 An act to authorize a special term of circuit courts of the United States for the southern district of Mississippi, to be held at Scranton, in Jackson County. Vetoed March S, 1878. Regular veto.
 To restrict the immigration of Chinese to the United States. Vetoed March 1, 1879 Regular Veto.
 To provide for the relief of certain settlers on the public lands, and to provide for the repayment of certain fees and commissions paid on void entries of public lands. Vetoed March 3, 1879. Pocket veto.
 To amend an act for the relief of Joseph B. Collins. Vetoed June 27, 1879. Regular Veto.
 Making appropriations for the support of the Army for fiscal year ending June 30- 1880. Vetoed April 29, 1879. Override failed in the House of Representatives, 121–110. Regular Veto.
 Making appropriations for legislative, executive and judicial expenses of the Government for the fiscal year ending June 30, 1880. Vetoed May 29, 1879. Override attempt failed in the House of Representatives 114–93. Regular Veto.
 To prohibit military interference at elections. Vetoed May 12, 1879. Override attempt failed in the House of Representatives, 128–97. Regular Veto.
 Making appropriations for certain judicial expenses. Vetoed June 23, 1879. Override attempt failed in the House of Representatives 85–63. Regular Veto.
 Making appropriations to pay fees of United States Marshals and their general deputies. Vetoed June 30, 1879. Regular Veto.
 Regulating pay and appointment of special deputy marshals. Vetoed June 15, 1880. Regular Veto.
 Making appropriations to supply certain deficiencies in the appropriations for the service of the Government for the fiscal year ending June 30, 1880. Vetoed May 4, 1880.  Regular Veto.
 To facilitate the refunding of the national debt. Vetoed March 3, 1881. Regular Veto.

James Garfield

No vetoes. Garfield was the most recent president to have made no use of the veto power.  However, he was president for only six-and-a-half months before his assassination.

Chester Arthur

President Arthur vetoed twelve bills, of which four were regular vetoes and eight were pocket vetoes. One was overridden.

 To execute certain treaty stipulations relating to Chinese. Vetoed April 4, 1882. Regular Veto.
 To regulate the carriage of passengers by sea. Vetoed July 1, 1882. Regular veto.
 Making appropriations for the construction, repair, and preservation of certain works on rivers and harbors. Vetoed August 1, 1882. Senate Override August 2, 1882. Regular veto.
 To provide for the relief of Fitz John Porter. Vetoed July 2, 1884. Regular veto.
 To confirm the status of John N. Quackenbush as a commander in the United States Navy. Vetoed July 7, 1884. Pocket veto.
 To provide for the relief of Joseph F. Wilson. Vetoed July 7, 1884. Pocket veto.
 To confirm the title of Benjamin F. Pope to his office of assistant surgeon, in the United States Army. Vetoed July 7, 1884. Pocket veto.
 To provide for the relief of George P. Webster. Vetoed July 7, 1884. Pocket veto.
 To provide for the relief of Brevet Major General William W. Averell, United States Army. Vetoed July 7, 1884. Pocket veto.
 Authorizing the appointment and retirement of Samuel Kramer as a chaplain in the Navy of the United States. Vetoed July 7, 1884. Pocket veto.
 To provide for the retirement of Colonel Wenry J. Hunt as a major general of the United States Army. Vetoed March 3, 1885. Pocket Veto.
 Relating to a claim made by Doctor John B. Read against the United States. Vetoed March 3, 1885. Pocket veto.

Grover Cleveland

584 total vetoes, including 238 pocket vetoes (414 first term, 170 second term).

Grover Cleveland vetoed more bills in his two terms than all other presidents to that date combined. Only Franklin D. Roosevelt, who had more than three complete terms in office to Cleveland's two, vetoed more.  Strongly opposed to what he perceived as "pork barrel" spending, and favoring limited government, he vetoed more than 200 private bills granting pensions to individual Civil War veterans. Reacting to these vetoes, Congress passed a bill that would have granted a pension to any disabled veteran. He vetoed this bill as well. This is widely perceived to have been a factor in the defeat of his 1888 bid for re-election.

In addition to these, he also vetoed a bill that would have distributed seed grain to drought-stricken farmers in the American West, and bills increasing the monetary supply.  He also refused to sign, but did not veto, the Wilson–Gorman Tariff Act.

Benjamin Harrison

William McKinley

Theodore Roosevelt

William Taft

Woodrow Wilson

Thirty-three regular vetoes, eleven pocket vetoes. Six were overridden.

Wilson wrote: "The President is no greater than his prerogative of veto makes him; he is, in other words, powerful rather as a branch of the legislature than as the titular head of the Executive."

Some of Wilson's vetoes include:

 October 27, 1919: Vetoed the Volstead Act, but his veto was overridden by Congress.
 December 14, 1916: Vetoed the Immigration Act of 1917, but his veto was overridden by Congress.

 Warren Harding 

Harding vetoed the Soldiers' Adjusted Compensation Act (soldiers' bonus) on September 19, 1922, arguing the country could not afford the cost during the postwar recession. Congress failed, by four votes, to override his veto.

Calvin Coolidge

Coolidge vetoed the McNary–Haugen Farm Relief Bill because he thought its cost was too high.

Herbert Hoover

 May 11, 1932 – Vetoed a bill to amend the Tariff Act of 1930 and for other purposes. The House of Representatives sustained the veto.

Franklin D. Roosevelt

635 vetoes.

Franklin D. Roosevelt vetoed more bills than any other president in history. This is partly because of the many new ideas for solutions to the problems caused by the Great Depression and World War II, and partly because he served three full terms (Roosevelt died roughly three months into his fourth term). Grover Cleveland vetoed more bills per term.

Harry S. Truman

180 regular vetoes, 70 pocket vetoes.

Congress overrode 12 of Truman's vetoes. One of the most notable was the Taft–Hartley Act, which weakened labor unions. Another was the McCarran Internal Security Act, which established the Subversive Activities Control Board to investigate suspected communist and/or fascist sympathizers.

Dwight Eisenhower

John F. Kennedy

Lyndon B. Johnson

Sixteen regular vetoes, fourteen pocket vetoes. None were overridden.

Like President Kennedy before him, President Johnson made no public veto threats. His is the most recent example of an override-free administration.

 December 30, 1963: Pocket vetoed , A bill to amend the Tariff Act of 1930. The bill was presented to the president on December 19, 1963.
 December 30, 1963: Pocket vetoed , A bill to confer jurisdiction on the Court of Claims to entertain, hear, and determine a motion for a new trial on the claim of Robert Alexander. The bill was presented to the president on December 21, 1963.
 March 23, 1964: Vetoed , A bill to confer jurisdiction on the Court of Claims to hear, determine, and render judgment upon the claim of R. Gordon Finney, Jr. No override attempt made.
 August 6, 1964: Vetoed , A bill for the relief of Anthony F. Bernardo and Ambrose A. Cerrito. No override attempt made.
 August 11, 1964: Vetoed , A bill for the relief of Catalina Properties, Incorporated. No override attempt made.
 August 31, 1964: Pocket vetoed , A bill for the relief of the estate of Eileen G. Foster. The bill was presented to the president on August 14, 1964. The pocket veto occurred during a recess from August 21, 1964, until August 31, 1964.
 September 1, 1964: Vetoed , A bill for the relief of Wetsel-Oviatt Lumber Co., Inc., Omo Ranch, El Dorado County, California. No override attempt made.
 October 3, 1964: Pocket vetoed , A bill for the relief of Chester A. Brothers and Anna Brothers, his wife.
 June 5, 1965: Vetoed , A bill provide assistance to the States of California, Oregon, Washington, Nevada, and Idaho for the re-construction of areas damaged by recent floods and high waters. No override attempt made.
 June 14, 1965: Vetoed , A bill for the relief of Daniel Walter Miles. No override attempt made.
 June 26, 1965: Vetoed , A bill for the relief of Staiman Bros.-Simon Wrecking Company. No override attempt made.
 August 21, 1965: Vetoed , A bill to authorize certain construction at military installations, and for other purposes. No override attempt made.
 September 10, 1965: Vetoed , A bill to incorporate the Youth Councils on Civic Affairs, and for other purposes. No override attempt made.
 October 4, 1965: Vetoed , A bill for the relief of Cecil Graham. No override attempt made.
 October 20, 1965: Vetoed , A bill for the relief of Theodore Zissu. No override attempt made.
 July 19, 1966: Vetoed , A bill to provide for cost-of-living adjustments in star route contract prices. No override attempt made.
 September 12, 1966: Vetoed , A bill to strengthen the financial condition of the Employees' Life Insurance Fund created by the Federal Employees' Group Life Insurance Act, to provide certain adjustments in amounts of group life and group accidental death and dismemberment insurance under such Act, and for other purposes. No override attempt made.
 October 10, 1966: Vetoed , A bill for the relief of Gilmour C. MacDonald, colonel, U.S. Air Force (retired). No override attempt made.
 October 22, 1966: Pocket vetoed , A bill to authorize the Secretary of the Interior to make disposition of geothermal resources, and for other purposes. The bill was presented to the president on November 2, 1966.
 October 22, 1966: Pocket vetoed , A bill for the relief of Miss Elisabeth von Oberndorff. The bill was presented to the president on October 28, 1966.
 October 22, 1966: Pocket vetoed , A bill relating to crime and criminal procedure in the District of Columbia. The bill was presented to the president on October 25, 1966.
 October 22, 1966: Pocket vetoed , A bill to establish the past and present location of a certain portion of the Colorado River for certain purposes. The bill was presented to the president on October 25, 1966.
 August 12, 1967: Vetoed , An act to amend Title 5, United States Code, to provide additional group life insurance and accidental death and dismemberment insurance for Federal employees, and to strengthen the financial condition of the Employees' Life Insurance Fund. No override attempt made.
 December 8, 1967: Vetoed , A bill to grant the masters of certain U.S. vessels a lien on those vessels for their wages and for certain disbursements. No override attempt made.
 December 15, 1967: Pocket vetoed , A bill for the relief of Dr. George H. Edler. The bill was presented to the president on December 12, 1967
 September 4, 1968, Pocket vetoed , A bill to amend section 202 of the Agricultural Act of 1956. The bill was presented to the president on July 31, 1968. The pocket veto occurred during a recess from August 2, 1968, until September 4, 1968.
 October 14, 1968: Pocket vetoed , A bill to amend Title II of the Merchant Marine Act, 1936, to create an independent Federal Maritime Administration, and for other purposes. The bill was presented to the president on October 18, 1968.
 October 14, 1968: Pocket vetoed , A bill for the relief of Joseph H. Bonduki. The bill was presented to the president on October 14, 1968.
 October 14, 1968: Pocket vetoed , A bill for the relief of Robert L. Miller and Mildred M. Miller. The bill was presented to the president on October 12, 1968.
 October 14, 1968: Pocket vetoed , A bill to render the assertion of land claims by the United States based upon accretion or avulsion subject to legal and equitable defense to which private persons asserting such claims would be subject. The bill was presented to the president on October 14, 1968.

Richard Nixon

Twenty-six regular vetoes, seventeen pocket vetoes. Seven were overridden. There were no vetoes in the first session of the Ninety-first Congress.
 December 10, 1971 – Vetoed the Comprehensive Child Development Act.
 October 17, 1972 – Veto of the Clean Water Act was overridden by Congress (date is enactment date).
 November 7, 1973 – Veto of the War Powers Act of 1973 was overridden in Congress (date is enactment date).
 January 4, 1974 – Pocket vetoed a bill to provide federal funds for local purchases of buses for mass transportation.
 March 6, 1974 – Vetoed an emergency energy bill

Gerald Ford
Forty eight regular vetoes, eighteen pocket vetoes. Twelve were overridden.
 October 29, 1974 – Veto of H.R. 6624 Private Relief Bill for Burt, Pope and Kennedy (Miami Herald Reporters)

This bill would have provided for payment, "as a gratuity," of $45,482 to Mr. Burt and for similar payments of $36,750 each to the widow and son of Douglas E. Kennedy for injuries and other damages Mr. Burt and Mr. Kennedy sustained as a result of gunshot wounds inflicted by U.S. military personnel in the Dominican Republic in 1965.

Jimmy Carter

 1977: Vetoed Department of Energy authorization bill.
 1978: Vetoed bill to reduce federal firefighters' work week.

Congress overrode two of Carter's vetoes. Not since 1952 had a Congress controlled by the president's own party overridden a veto. On June 5, 1980, Carter vetoed a bill that repealed a crude oil import fee of $4.62 per barrel. The same day, the House voted 335–34 to override Carter's veto. The Senate followed suit the next day by 68 votes to 10. Carter's own party (the Democrats) had a 59-seat majority (276–157) in the House, and an eight-seat majority (58–41) in the Senate. In August 1980, Congress overrode his veto of a veterans' health care bill, by votes of 401–5 in the House, and 85–0 in the Senate.

Ronald Reagan

Twelve normal vetoes, six pocket vetoes. Four were overridden.

 November 23, 1981: Vetoed , Continuing Appropriations for fiscal year 1982.  No override attempt made.
 December 30, 1981: Pocket vetoed , To amend the Federal Bankruptcies Act of 1978.
 March 20, 1982: Vetoed , Standby Petroleum Allocation Act of 1982.  Override attempt failed in Senate, 58–36 ( needed).
 June 1, 1982: Vetoed , Southern Arizona Water Rights Settlement Act of 1982.  No override attempt made.
 June 24, 1982: Vetoed , Urgent Supplemental Appropriations Act, 1982.  Override attempt failed in House, 253–151 ( needed).
 June 25, 1982: Vetoed , Urgent Supplemental Appropriations Act, 1982.  Override attempt failed in House, 242–169 ( needed).
 July 8, 1982: Vetoed , A bill to amend the manufacturing clause of the copyright law. Overridden by House, 324–86 ( needed).
 August 28, 1982: Vetoed , Supplemental Appropriations Act, 1982. Overridden by House, 301–117 ( needed).
 October 15, 1982: Vetoed , A bill to amend section 12 of the Contract Disputes Act of 1978.  No override attempt made.
 October 22, 1982: Vetoed , Environmental Research, Development, and Demonstration Act of 1983.  No override attempt made.
 January 3, 1983: Pocket vetoed , A bill to amend and extend the Tribally Controlled Community College Assistance Act of 1978, and for other purposes.
 January 4, 1983: Pocket vetoed , A bill for the relief of Mocatta & Goldsmid, Ltd., Sharps, Pixley & Co., Ltd., and Primary Metal and Mineral Corp (private bill).
 January 14, 1983: Pocket vetoed , A bill to amend the Contract Services for Drug Dependent Federal Offenders Act of 1978.
 January 14, 1983: Pocket vetoed , Florida Wilderness Act of 1982.
 January 14, 1983: Pocket vetoed , A bill to make certain technical amendments to improve implementation of the Education Consolidation and Improvement Act of 1981.
 December 17, 1985: Vetoed , Textile and Apparel Trade Enforcement Act of 1985. Override attempt failed in House, 276–149 ( needed).
 September 26, 1986: Vetoed, Comprehensive Anti-Apartheid Act. Overridden by House, 292–133 ( needed).
 March 16, 1988: Vetoed , Civil Rights Restoration Act of 1987. Overridden by House, 313–83 ( needed).

George H. W. Bush

Twenty-nine vetoes, fifteen pocket vetoes. One was overridden.

 June 13, 1989: Vetoed , Fair Labor Standards Amendments of 1989.  Override attempt failed in House, 247–178 ( needed).
 July 31, 1989: Vetoed , Prohibiting the export of technology, defense articles, and defense services to codevelop or coproduce the FS-X aircraft with Japan.  Override attempt failed in Senate, 66–34 ( needed).
 October 21, 1989: Vetoed , Departments of Labor, Health and Human Services, and Education, and Related Agencies Appropriations Act, 1990.  Override attempt failed in House, 231–191 ( needed).
 October 27, 1989: Vetoed , District of Columbia Appropriations Act, 1990.  No override attempt made.
 November 19, 1989: Vetoed , Foreign Operations, Export Financing, and Related Programs Appropriations Act, 1990.  No override attempt made.
 November 20, 1989: Vetoed , District of Columbia Appropriations Act, 1990.  No override attempt made.
 November 21, 1989: Vetoed , To establish a commission to investigate and report respecting the dispute between Eastern Airlines and its collective bargaining units, and for other purposes.  Override attempt failed in House, 261–160 ( needed).
 November 21, 1989: Vetoed , Foreign Relations Authorization Act, Fiscal Years 1990 and 1991.  No override attempt made.
 November 30, 1989: Vetoed (or in the alternative pocket vetoed) , Emergency Chinese Immigration Relief Act of 1989.  Overridden by House, 390–25 ( needed).  Override attempt failed in Senate, 62–37 ( needed).
 May 24, 1990: Vetoed , Amtrak Reauthorization and Improvement Act of 1990.  Overridden by House, 294–123 ( needed).  Override attempt failed in Senate, 64–36 ( needed).
 June 15, 1990: Vetoed , Hatch Act Reform Amendments of 1990.  Overridden by House, 327–93 ( needed).  Override attempt failed in Senate, 65–35 ( needed).
 June 29, 1990: Vetoed , Family and Medical Leave Act of 1990.  Override attempt failed in House, 232–195 ( needed).
 October 5, 1990: Vetoed , Textile, Apparel, and Footwear Trade Act of 1990.  Override attempt failed in House, 275–152 ( needed).
 October 6, 1990: Vetoed , Making further continuing appropriations for the fiscal year 1991, and for other purposes.  Override attempt failed in House, 260–138 ( needed).
 October 22, 1990: Vetoed , Civil Rights Act of 1990.  Override attempt failed in Senate, 66–34 ( needed).
 November 10, 1990: Pocket vetoed , Orphan Drug Amendments of 1990.
 November 17, 1990: Pocket vetoed , For the relief of Mrs. Joan R. Daronco (private bill).
 November 17, 1990: Pocket vetoed , Omnibus Export Amendments Act of 1990.
 November 21, 1990: Pocket vetoed , To revise provisions of law that provide a preference to Indians.
 November 30, 1990: Pocket vetoed , Intelligence Authorization Act, Fiscal Year 1991.
 August 17, 1991: Vetoed , Making appropriations for the government of the District of Columbia and other activities chargeable in whole or in part against the revenues of said District for the fiscal year ending September 30, 1992, and for other purposes.  No override attempt made.
 October 11, 1991: Vetoed , Emergency Unemployment Compensation Act of 1991.  Override attempt failed in Senate, 65–35 ( needed).
 November 19, 1991: Vetoed , Departments of Labor, Health and Human Services, and Education, and Related Agencies Appropriations Act, 1992.  Override attempt failed in House, 276–156 ( needed).
 March 2, 1992: Vetoed , United States–China Act of 1991.  Overridden by House, 357–61 ( needed).  Override attempt failed in Senate, 60–38 ( needed).
 March 20, 1992: Vetoed , Tax Fairness and Economic Growth Acceleration Act of 1992.  Override attempt failed in House, 211–215 ( needed).
 May 9, 1992: Vetoed , Congressional Campaign Spending Limit and Election Reform Act of 1992.  Override attempt failed in Senate, 57–42 ( needed).
 June 16, 1992: Vetoed , To amend the Act entitled "An Act to provide for the disposition of funds appropriated to pay judgment in favor of the Mississippi Sioux Indians in Indian Claims Commission dockets numbered 142, 359, 360, 361, 362, and 363, and for other purposes", approved October 25, 1972 (86 Stat. 1168 et seq.).  No override attempt made.
 June 23, 1992: Vetoed , National Institutes of Health Revitalization Amendments of 1992.  Override attempt failed in House, 271–156 ( needed).
 July 2, 1992: Vetoed , National Voter Registration Act of 1992.  Override attempt failed in Senate, 62–38 ( needed).
 September 22, 1992: Vetoed , Family and Medical Leave Act of 1992.  Overridden by Senate, 68–31 ( needed).  Override attempt failed in House, 258–169 ( needed).
 September 25, 1992: Vetoed , Family Planning Amendments Act of 1992.  Overridden by Senate, 73–26.  Override attempt failed in House, 266–148 ( needed).
 September 28, 1992: Vetoed , United States-China Act of 1992.  Overridden by House, 345–74 ( needed).  Override attempt failed in Senate, 59–40 ( needed).
 September 30, 1992: Vetoed , District of Columbia Supplemental Appropriations and Rescissions Act, 1992.  No override attempt made.
 October 3, 1992: Vetoed , Cable Television Consumer Protection and Competition Act of 1992. Overridden by Senate, 74–25 ( needed).
 October 21, 1992: Pocket vetoed , Jena Band of Choctaws of Louisiana Restoration Act.
 October 27, 1992: Pocket vetoed , To direct the Secretary of the Interior to conduct a study of the historical and cultural resources in the vicinity of the city of Lynn, Massachusetts, and make recommendations on the appropriate role of the Federal Government in preserving and interpreting such historical and cultural resources.
 October 27, 1992: Pocket vetoed , New River Wild and Scenic Study Act of 1992.
 October 27, 1992: Pocket vetoed , To establish Dry Tortugas National Park in the State of Florida.
 October 27, 1992: Pocket vetoed , Granting the consent of the Congress to a supplemental compact or agreement between the Commonwealth of Pennsylvania and the State of New Jersey concerning the Delaware River Port Authority.
 October 28, 1992: Pocket vetoed , To direct the Secretary of the Interior to conduct a study of the feasibility of including Revere Beach, located in the city of Revere, Massachusetts, in the National Park System.
 October 30, 1992: Pocket vetoed , Federal Courts Administration Act of 1992.
 October 31, 1992: Pocket vetoed , To amend the Consolidated Farm and Rural Development Act.
 October 31, 1992: Pocket vetoed , Military Health Care Initiatives Act of 1992.
 November 5, 1992: Pocket vetoed , Revenue Act of 1992.

Bill Clinton

Thirty-six vetoes, one pocket veto. Two were overridden.

 June 7, 1995: Vetoed , Emergency Supplemental Appropriations for Additional Disaster Assistance and Recissions for Fiscal Year 1995.  No override attempt made.
 August 11, 1995: Vetoed , Bosnia and Herzegovina Self-Defense Act of 1995.  No override attempt made.
 October 3, 1995: Vetoed , Legislative Branch Appropriations Act, FY 1996.  No override attempt made.
 November 13, 1995: Vetoed , Second Continuing Resolution for fiscal year 1996.  No override attempt made.
 November 13, 1995: Vetoed , Temporary Increase in the Statutory Debt Limit.  No override attempt made.
 December 6, 1995: Vetoed , Seven-Year Balanced Budget Reconciliation Act of 1995.  No override attempted.
 December 18, 1995: Vetoed , Department of the Interior and Related Agencies Appropriations Act, 1996.  Override attempt failed in House, 239–177 ( needed).
 December 18, 1995: Vetoed , Department of the Interior and Related Agencies Appropriations Act, 1996.  No override attempted.
 December 19, 1995: Vetoed , Private Securities Litigation Reform Act of 1995. Overridden by House, 319–100 ( needed).
 December 19, 1995: Vetoed , Departments of Commerce, Justice, and State, the Judiciary, and Related Agencies Appropriations Act, 1996.  Override attempt failed in House, 240–159 ( needed).
 December 28, 1995: Vetoed , National Defense Authorization Act for Fiscal Year 1996.  Override attempt failed in House, 240–156 ( needed).
 January 9, 1996: Vetoed , Personal Responsibility and Work Opportunity Act of 1995.  No override attempt made.
 April 10, 1996: Vetoed , banning partial birth abortions.  Overridden in House, 285–137 ( needed).  Override attempt failed in Senate, 58–40 ( needed).
 April 12, 1996: Vetoed , Foreign Relations Authorization Act, Fiscal Years 1996 and 1997.  Override attempt failed in House, 234–188 ( needed).
 May 2, 1996:  Vetoed , Common Sense Product Liability Legal Reform Act of 1996.  Override attempt failed in House, 258–163 ( needed).
 July 30, 1996: Vetoed , Teamwork for Employees and Managers Act of 1995.  No override attempt made.
 October 2, 1996: Vetoed , Silvio O. Conte National Fish and Wildlife Refuge Eminent Domain Prevention Act.  No override attempt made.
 June 9, 1997: Vetoed , Supplemental Appropriations and Recissions Act, FY 1997.  No override attempt made.
 October 10, 1997: Vetoed , the second attempted partial birth abortion ban.  Overridden by House, 296–132 ( needed).  Override attempt failed in Senate, 64–36 ( needed).
 November 13, 1997: Vetoed , a line item veto override bill. Overridden by House, 347–69 ( needed).
 May 20, 1998: Vetoed , District of Columbia Student Opportunity Scholarship Act of 1997.  No override attempt made.
 June 23, 1998: Vetoed , Iran Missile Proliferation Sanctions Act of 1998.  No override attempt made.
 July 21, 1998: Vetoed , Education Savings and School Excellence Act of 1998.  No override attempt made.
 October 7, 1998: Vetoed , Agriculture, Rural Development, Food and Drug Administration, and Related Agencies Appropriations Act, 1999.  No override attempt made.
 October 21, 1998: Vetoed , Foreign Affairs Reform and Restructuring Act of 1998.  No override attempt made.
 September 23, 1999: Vetoed , Taxpayer Refund and Relief Act of 1999.  No override attempt made.
 September 28, 1999: Vetoed , District of Columbia Appropriations Act, 2000. No override attempt made.
 October 18, 1999: Vetoed , Foreign Operations, Export Financing, and Related Programs Appropriations Act, 2000.  No override attempt made.
 October 25, 1999: Vetoed , Departments of Commerce, Justice, and State, the Judiciary, and Related Agencies Appropriations Act, 2000.  No override attempt made.
 November 3, 1999: Vetoed , FY 2000 District of Columbia and Departments of Labor, Health and Human Services, and Education, and Related Agencies appropriations bill.  No override attempt made.
 April 25, 2000: Vetoed , Nuclear Waste Policy Amendments Act of 2000. Override attempt failed in Senate, 64–35 ( needed).
 August 5, 2000: Vetoed , Marriage Tax Relief Reconciliation Act of 2000.  Override attempt failed in House, 270–158 ( needed).
 August 31, 2000: Vetoed , Death Tax Elimination Act of 2000.  Override attempt failed in House, 274–157 ( needed).
 October 7, 2000: Vetoed , Energy and Water Appropriations Act, 2001. Overridden by House, 315–98 on October 11 ( needed).  No attempt made in Senate.
 October 30, 2000: Vetoed , Legislative Branch and the Treasury and General Government Appropriations Act, 2001.  No override attempt made.
 November 4, 2000: Vetoed , Intelligence Authorization Act for Fiscal Year 2001.  No override attempt made.
 December 19, 2000: Pocket vetoed , Bankruptcy Reform Act of 2000.

George W. Bush

Twelve vetoes, including one veto whose status is disputed (Bush claimed it was a pocket veto; the Senate considers it to have been a regular veto):

 July 19, 2006: Vetoed , Stem Cell Research Enhancement Act of 2005, a bill to ease restrictions on federal funding for embryonic stem cell research.  Override attempt failed in House, 235–193 ( needed).
 May 1, 2007: Vetoed , U.S. Troop Readiness, Veterans' Care, Katrina Recovery, and Iraq Accountability Appropriations Act, 2007. Override attempt failed in House, 222–203 ( needed).
 June 20, 2007: Vetoed , Stem Cell Research Enhancement Act of 2007. No override attempt made.
 October 3, 2007:  Vetoed , Children's Health Insurance Program Reauthorization Act of 2007 ("SCHIP"). Override attempt failed in House, 273–156 ( votes needed).
 November 2, 2007: Vetoed , Water Resources Development Act of 2007. Overridden by House, 361–54 ( votes needed).
 November 13, 2007: Vetoed , Departments of Labor, Health and Human Services, and Education, and Related Agencies Appropriations Act of 2008.  Override attempt failed in House, 277–141 ( votes needed).
 December 12, 2007: Vetoed , Children's Health Insurance Program Reauthorization Act of 2007.  Override attempt failed in House, 260–152 (275 votes needed).
 December 28, 2007: Vetoed , National Defense Authorization Act for Fiscal Year 2008. No override attempt made.
 March 8, 2008: Vetoed , Intelligence Authorization Act for Fiscal Year 2008.Text of Message to the House of Representatives Returning Without Approval the "Intelligence Authorization Act for Fiscal Year 2008", The American Presidency Project Override attempt failed in House, 225–188 (276 votes needed).
 May 21, 2008: Vetoed , 2007 U.S. Farm Bill. Overridden by House, 316–108 (283 votes needed). Overridden by Senate, 82–13 (64 votes needed). Enacted as Pub.L. 110–234 over the president's veto. Due to a clerical error, this act was repealed by Pub.L. 110–246.
 June 18, 2008: Vetoed , 2007 U.S. Farm Bill, re-passed by Congress to correct a clerical error in HR 2419. Overridden by House, 317–109 (284 votes required). Overridden by Senate, 80–14 (63 votes needed). Enacted as Pub.L. 110–246 over the president's veto.
 July 15, 2008: Vetoed , Medicare Improvements for Patients and Providers Act of 2008. Overridden by House, 383–41 (283 votes required.) Overridden by Senate, 70–26 (64 votes required).

Barack Obama 

President Obama issued 12; of which the status of five is disputed. (Obama considered them pocket vetoes, but since he returned the parchments to Congress, the Senate considers them regular vetoes.) They are:
 December 30, 2009: Vetoed , a joint resolution making further continuing appropriations for fiscal year 2010, and for other purposes. Override attempt failed in House, 143–245, 1 present (260 needed).President Obama characterized his veto of this bill as a pocket veto, but since he returned the parchment to Congress, Congress treated it as a regular veto. See Vetoes by President Barack H. Obama
 October 7, 2010: Vetoed , the Interstate Recognition of Notarizations Act of 2010. Override attempt failed in House, 185–235 ( needed).
 February 24, 2015: Vetoed , the Keystone XL Pipeline Approval Act. Override attempt failed in Senate, 62–36 ( needed).
 March 31, 2015: Vetoed , a joint resolution providing for congressional disapproval under chapter 8 of title 5, United States Code, of the rule submitted by the National Labor Relations Board relating to representation case procedures. The Senate voted to table the veto message rather than vote on an override of the veto. Tabled 96–3.
 October 22, 2015: Vetoed , the National Defense Authorization Act for Fiscal Year 2016.
 December 19, 2015: Vetoed , a joint resolution providing for congressional disapproval under chapter 8 of title 5, United States Code, of a rule submitted by the Environmental Protection Agency relating to "Standards of Performance for Greenhouse Gas Emissions from New, Modified, and Reconstructed Stationary Sources: Electric Utility Generating Units".
 December 19, 2015: Vetoed , a joint resolution providing for congressional disapproval under chapter 8 of title 5, United States Code, of a rule submitted by the Environmental Protection Agency relating to "Carbon Pollution Emission Guidelines for Existing Stationary Sources: Electric Utility Generating Units".
 January 8, 2016: Vetoed , the Restoring Americans' Healthcare Freedom Reconciliation Act of 2015. Override attempt failed in House, 241–186 (285 votes needed).
 January 19, 2016: Vetoed , a joint resolution providing for congressional disapproval under chapter 8 of title 5, United States Code, of the rule submitted by the Corps of Engineers and the Environmental Protection Agency relating to the definition of "waters of the United States" under the Federal Water Pollution Control Act
  June 8, 2016: Vetoed , a joint resolution disapproving the rule submitted by the Department of Labor relating to the definition of the term "Fiduciary".
  July 22, 2016: Vetoed , Presidential Allowance Modernization Act of 2016.
 September 23, 2016: Vetoed , Justice Against Sponsors of Terrorism Act. Overridden by Senate, 97–1 (66 votes needed). Overridden by House, 348–77, 1 present (284 votes needed).

Donald Trump

 March 15, 2019: Vetoed , Joint Resolution relating to a national emergency declared by the President on February 15, 2019.  The measure was a joint resolution to overturn the declaration of a national emergency at the Mexico–United States border. Override attempt failed in House, 248–181 ( needed).
 April 16, 2019: Vetoed , Joint Resolution to direct the removal of United States Armed Forces from hostilities in the Republic of Yemen that have not been authorized by Congress. The measure was a joint resolution to end U.S. participation in Yemen's civil war and denounce the Saudi-led bombing campaign there. Override attempt failed in Senate, 53–45 ( needed).
 July 24, 2019: Vetoed , Joint Resolution that prohibits the proposed sale of various defense articles and related support services to Saudi Arabia, the United Kingdom, Spain, and Italy, as described in Executive Communication 1427 published in the Congressional Record on June 3, 2019. Override attempt failed in Senate, 45–40 ( needed)
 July 24, 2019: Vetoed , Joint Resolution that prohibits the proposed sale of various defense articles and related support services to the United Arab Emirates, the United Kingdom, and France, as described in Executive Communication 1425 and published in the Congressional Record'' on June 3, 2019. Override attempt failed in Senate, 45–39 ( needed).
 July 24, 2019: Vetoed , Joint Resolution that prohibits the proposed sale of various defense articles and related support services to Saudi Arabia and the United Kingdom, as described in Executive Communication 1422 and published in the Congressional Record on June 3, 2019. Override attempt failed in Senate, 46–41 ( needed).
 October 15, 2019: Vetoed , Joint Resolution that would terminate the national emergency declared in Proclamation 9844 of February 15, 2019, pursuant to the National Emergencies Act, regarding the ongoing crisis on our southern border. Override attempt failed in Senate, 53–36 ( needed).
 May 6, 2020: Vetoed , Joint resolution to direct the removal of United States Armed Forces from hostilities against the Islamic Republic of Iran that have not been authorized by Congress. Override attempt failed in Senate, 49–44 ( needed)
 May 29, 2020: Vetoed  a joint resolution providing for congressional disapproval under chapter 8 of title 5, United States Code, of the rule submitted by the Department of Education relating to "Borrower Defense Institutional Accountability". Override attempt failed in House, 238–173 ( needed).
 December 23, 2020: Vetoed , the William M. (Mac) Thornberry National Defense Authorization Act for Fiscal Year 2021. Overridden by House, 322–87 ( votes needed). Overridden by Senate, 81–13 (63 votes needed).
 January 1, 2021: Vetoed , the Driftnet Modernization and Bycatch Reduction Act. No override attempt made.

Joe Biden

As of February 2023, President Biden has not vetoed any bills passed by Congress.

See also
 Signing statement

Notes

References

External links

 Regular Vetoes and Pocket Vetoes: An Overview (report) by Kevin R. Kosar
 Senate Reference Webpage on Vetoes, which includes lists of vetoes from 1789 to the current day.

Veto
Vetoes